The Pratt & Whitney PW6000 is a high-bypass turbofan jet engine designed for the Airbus A318 with a design thrust range of .

Design and development
Pratt & Whitney designed the engine with minimum complexity to significantly reduce maintenance cost and achieve weight and fuel consumption savings. However, tests revealed that the initial five-stage high compressor based design did not meet promised fuel burn performance. As a result, many of the original customers switched their orders to the rival CFM56-5. To address the problem, Pratt & Whitney re-certified an updated design utilizing a six-stage high compressor designed by MTU Aero Engines in order to achieve promised performance. The German company manufactured the high-pressure compressor and the low-pressure turbine. The HP compressor is driven by a single-stage turbine. On the LP spool a three-stage turbine drives a single-stage fan and a four-stage LP compressor.

The engine made its first flight August 21, 2000 on a test aircraft flown from Plattsburgh International Airport (KPBG), successfully completing a 1-hour-20-minute flight. The engine final assembly line is located at MTU Aero Engines at their location in Hanover, Germany.

LAN Airlines confirmed an order for 15 Airbus A318 aircraft, for a total of 34 engines (30 installed and 4 spares) powered by PW-6000 engines on 15 August 2005. In addition, LAN signed with Pratt and Whitney to power up to 25 option aircraft.  If LAN exercises all options it would mean an additional 56 (50 installed and six spare) engines.

Prior to the LAN order, 84 CFM56-5 powered Airbus A318 aircraft had been ordered, with 28 currently in service as of December 2005.

Applications

 Airbus A318

Specifications

See also

References

 
 https://web.archive.org/web/20160210191426/http://www.pw.utc.com/Content/Press_Kits/pdf/ce_pw6000_pCard.pdf

External links

 Pratt & Whitney PW6000 product page
 Cutaway drawing of a PW6000
 Cutaway drawing of a PW6000
 Exploded view of a PW6000 (Hi-Res picture)
 Exploded view of a PW6000 (Lo-Res picture)

High-bypass turbofan engines
PW6000
2000s turbofan engines